Alsco Uniforms 300 may refer to any of the following NASCAR Xfinity Series races:

NASCAR Xfinity Series at Las Vegas (spring race)
NASCAR Xfinity Series at Charlotte (spring race)
NASCAR Xfinity Series at Las Vegas (fall race)